Joseph Tubb (born September 30, 1963) is an American politician and businessman serving as a member of the Mississippi House of Representatives from the 87th district. Elected in November 2020, he assumed office on December 8, 2020.

Early life and education 
Tubb was born in Jackson, Mississippi. He earned a Bachelor of Science degree in business administration from Mississippi College in 1986.

Career 
From 1986 to 2011, Tubb worked in sales and management for the Tubb Equipment Company. Since 2014, he has worked as a real estate agent. Tubb was elected to the Mississippi House of Representatives in November 2020 and assumed office the following month.

References 

Mississippi College alumni
Republican Party members of the Mississippi House of Representatives
Politicians from Jackson, Mississippi
1963 births
Living people
People from Jackson, Mississippi
People from Hattiesburg, Mississippi
People from Lamar County, Mississippi